The men's freestyle lightweight was a freestyle wrestling event held as part of the Wrestling at the 1928 Summer Olympics programme. It was the fifth appearance of the event. Lightweight was the third-lightest category, including wrestlers weighing up to 65 kilograms. Eino Leino won his third Olympic medal, a bronze to go with his 1920 middleweight gold and 1924 welterweight silver.

Results
Source: Official results; Wudarski

Gold medal round

Silver medal round

Bronze medal round

References

Wrestling at the 1928 Summer Olympics